Aristotelia ochrostephana is a moth of the family Gelechiidae. It was described by Turner in 1933. It is found in Australia, where it has been recorded from South Australia.

References

Moths described in 1933
Aristotelia (moth)
Moths of Australia